Alderano Cybo-Malaspina may refer to:
Alderano Cybo-Malaspina (1552–1606), Crown prince of Massa and Carrara
Alderano Cybo-Malaspina (1613–1700), Italian Cardinal
Alderano I Cybo-Malaspina (1690–1731), Duke of Massa and Carrara